Dendrophylax filiformis is a species of orchid native to Cuba, Hispaniola, Jamaica and Puerto Rico.

References

filiformis
Orchids of the Caribbean
Orchids of Cuba
Orchids of Haiti
Orchids of Puerto Rico
Epiphytic orchids
Plants described in 1788
Flora without expected TNC conservation status